John Bradbury may refer to:
John Bradbury (naturalist) (1768–1823), Scottish botanist
John Bradbury, 1st Baron Bradbury (1872–1950), British economist and public servant
John Bradbury, 2nd Baron Bradbury (1914–1994), British peer
John Bradbury, 3rd Baron Bradbury (born 1940), British peer, grandson of the 1st Baron
John Bradbury (drummer) (1953–2015), English drummer with The Specials
John Bradbury (footballer, born 1878) (1878–?), English footballer
John Bradbury (Australian footballer) (1941–2020), Australian rules footballer
John Buckley Bradbury (1841–1930), English medical doctor and professor of medicine
alternate name of Jack Bradbury (1914–2004), American animator and comic book artist